Declan Hulme (born 14 January 1993) is an English rugby league footballer who plays as a  or on the  for the North Wales Crusaders in Betfred League 1.

Background
Hulme was born in St Helens, Merseyside, England.

Career
Hulme started his career at Widnes, and made his début against Salford at the end of the 2013 Super League season. He scored his first Vikings try during the 2014 season against Wakefield Trinity Wildcats.

References

External links
Zero Tackle profile

1993 births
Living people
Barrow Raiders players
English rugby league players
North Wales Crusaders players
Rugby league centres
Rugby league players from St Helens, Merseyside
Rugby league wingers
Whitehaven R.L.F.C. players
Widnes Vikings players
Workington Town players